Matthew or Matt Holmes may refer to:

 Matthew Currie Holmes (born 1974), Canadian actor, producer, writer, and director
 Matthew Holmes (cyclist) (born 1993), British cyclist
 Matthew Holmes (engineer) (1844–1903), Chief Mechanical Engineer of the North British Railway (1882–1903)
 Matthew Holmes (politician) (1817–1901), member of the New Zealand Legislative Council
 Matthew Holmes (director), Australian film director, producer, writer and actor
 Matt Holmes (actor) (born 1976), Australian actor
 Matt Holmes (Royal Marines officer) (1967–2021), British general
 Matt Holmes (soccer), retired American soccer player
 Matty Holmes (born 1969), English footballer